Power Stroke may refer to:

In motoring:
Power stroke (engine), the stroke of a cyclic motor which generates force
Power Stroke, a family of Ford diesel engines

Other:
Power stroke (baseball), a batter who hits for extra bases
Power stroke (biology), the molecular interactions of muscle contraction
Power stroke (swimming), a propulsion kick

See also
Power Stroke Diesel 200, a NASCAR race